Paul Fjelde  (August 12, 1892 – May 3, 1984) was a noted American sculptor and educator.<ref>[http://www.nd.gov/arts/online_artist_archive/images-pdfs/F/Fjelde_Paul.htm Online Artist Archive: Paul Fjelde (North Dakota Council on the Arts)] </ref>

Background
Paul Fjelde was born in Minneapolis, Minnesota. He was the son of Jacob Fjelde, who was a well-known sculptor in Norway when he emigrated to the United States in 1887. After Jacob’s untimely death at age 36, the Fjelde family moved to North Dakota in 1902. Margarethe Fjelde homesteaded with her four children in Burleigh County, North Dakota. Fjelde studied art in Valley City, North Dakota at the State Normal School, now the Valley City State University. He subsequently went to study under Chicago based sculptor Lorado Taft. He went on to study at the Minneapolis School of Art,  Beaux-Arts Institute of Design,  and the Art Students League of New York, at the Royal Danish Academy of Fine Arts, and at the Académie de la Grande Chaumière in Paris. After his retirement from Pratt Institute, Paul relocated to his summer place in Orleans, Massachusetts where he continued his work for several years. He died in Brewster, Massachusetts on May 3, 1984.

Career
Fjelde taught at Pratt Institute and was a professor emeritus from that institution. Fjelde served as chairman of the Sculpture Department at the Carnegie Institute of Technology. He was an instructor of sculpture at the National Academy Museum and School of Fine Arts. He was editor of  Sculpture Review between 1951 and 1955.
 
Among Fjelde’s most commonly recognized sculptural works is the Lincoln Monument in Frogner Park in Oslo.   His father's brother, Herman Olaus Fjelde (1866–1918), was chairman of the committee for the Lincoln Monument. On July 4, 1914, North Dakota Governor Louis Hanna presented the bronze bust of Abraham Lincoln to the nation of Norway.
During World War II, the bust in Frogner Park became a center for silent protest against Occupation of Norway by Nazi Germany. Every July 4 during the occupation, Norwegians gathered by the Lincoln bust in Frogner Park in silent protest at the affront to freedom the Nazis represented to the people of Norway. Fjelde’s bust is still prominent in the July 4 celebration that continues each year in Frogner Park.VCSU’s Sculptor and the Lincoln Bust (by Carla Kelly, Valley City State University. November 2006) 

Other noteworthy works include the statue of Col. Hans C. Heg, leader of the 15th Wisconsin Volunteer Regiment in Madison, Wisconsin, the Wendell Willkie Memorial in the Indiana Statehouse, the bronze plaque of Wendell Willkie in the Summit County Courthouse, Akron, Ohio, the bronze portrait of Orville Wright in the Hall of Fame for Great Americans, the John Scott Bradstreet tablet at the Minneapolis Institute of Arts, and the Pioneers Memorial in Council Bluffs, Iowa.

Fjelde received awards from the American-Scandinavian Foundation, Allied Artists of America, and the National Sculpture Society. His works were exhibited at the Art Institute of Chicago, 1913–1919 and the Norse-American Centennial Art Exhibition at the Minnesota State Fair in 1925. He was also among the exhibitors at the Society of Scandinavian-American Artists exhibition held at the Brooklyn Museum in 1932. His works were shown at the Pennsylvania Academy of Fine Arts, 1935–36 and 1940. Fjelde served as the editor of the National Sculpture Review from 1951 to 1955. In 1949 he was elected into the National Academy of Design as an Associate member, and became a full Academician in 1957.

Gallery

References

Other sources
Sundby-Hanson, Harry Norwegian Immigrant Contributions to America’s Making (International Press, New York: 1921)
Fjelde, Paul The Sculpture of Paul Fjelde'' (National Sculpture Review. Fall, 1969)

External links
Lincoln Monument, Frogner Park

1892 births
1984 deaths
Artists from Minneapolis
Art Students League of New York alumni
American people of Norwegian descent
Royal Danish Academy of Fine Arts alumni
Alumni of the Académie de la Grande Chaumière
Valley City State University alumni
Pratt Institute faculty
People from Burleigh County, North Dakota
Artists from North Dakota
20th-century American sculptors
20th-century American male artists
American male sculptors
Sculptors from New York (state)
Sculptors from Minnesota
Beaux-Arts Institute of Design (New York City) alumni